

List of Ambassadors

Daniel Biran Bayor (Non-Resident, Santo Domingo) 2018 -
Yehoshua Hacohen 1985 - 1988 
Shlomo Levy 1981 - 1985
Moshe Melamed 1979 - 1981
Gideon Saguy 1975 - 1979
Johanan Bein (Non-Resident, Santo Domingo) 1972 - 1974
Avraham Sarlouis (Non-Resident, Santo Domingo) 1967 - 1969
Eliashiv Ben-Horin (Non-Resident, Caracas) 1963 - 1967

References

Jamaica
Israel